Pancalia is a genus of moths in the family Cosmopterigidae.

Species
Pancalia amurella Gaedike, 1967
Pancalia aureatus C.K. Yang, 1977
Pancalia baldizzonella Riedl 1994
Pancalia gaedikei Sinev, 1985
Pancalia hexachrysa (Meyrick, 1935)
Pancalia isshikii Matsamura, 1931
Pancalia leuwenhoekella (Linnaeus, 1761)
Pancalia nodosella (Bruand, 1851)
Pancalia pyrophracta (Meyrick, 1924)
Pancalia sichotella Christoph, 1882
Pancalia sinense Gaedike, 1967
Pancalia schwarzella (Fabricius, 1798)
Pancalia swetlanae Sinev, 1985
Pancalia wuyiensis Z.W. Zhang & H.H. Li, 2009

Selected former species
Pancalia didesmococcusphaga Yang, 1977

References
Natural History Museum Lepidoptera genus database

Antequerinae
Moth genera